Brian Boner (born December 10, 1984) is an American politician and a Republican member of the Wyoming State Senate, representing the 2nd district since March 19, 2015.

Elections

2014
Incumbent Republican State Senator Jim Anderson resigned on March 3, 2015, after moving out of state.  Boner was one of three names submitted to both Platte and Converse County Commissions, along with Republicans Timothy Millikin and Kerry Powers.  He received 85.3% of the vote to finish Anderson's term.

2016
Boner ran for a full term, and defeated Darek Farmer in the Republican primary.  Farmer had been a candidate for the U.S. House seat being vacated by Cynthia Lummis.  Boner defeated Democrat Bill Cullen with 86% of the vote.

2020
Boner ran for a second full term and third overall. He ran without any major opposition in both the Republican primary and general election; he won the Republican primary with 99.1% of the vote and won reelection in the general election with 98.6% of the vote.

References

External links
Official page at the Wyoming Legislature
Profile at Ballotpedia

1984 births
Living people
Republican Party Wyoming state senators
University of Wyoming alumni
University of Nebraska alumni
21st-century American politicians
People from Douglas, Wyoming